Wiborgiella is a genus of flowering plants in the family Fabaceae. It belongs to the subfamily Faboideae.

They are native to the Cape Provinces and Free State (province) in South Africa.

The genus name of Wiborgiella is in honour of Erik Viborg (1759–1822), who was a Danish veterinarian and botanist.

Species
Wiborgiella comprises the following species:
 Wiborgiella argentea 
 Wiborgiella bowieana (Benth.) Boatwr. and B-E.Van Wyk
 Wiborgiella dahlgrenii 
 Wiborgiella fasciculata (Benth.) Boatwr. and B-E.Van Wyk
 Wiborgiella humilis (Thunb.) Boatwr. & B.-E. van Wyk
 Wiborgiella inflata (Bolus) Boatwr. and B-E.Van Wyk
 Wiborgiella leipoldtiana (Schltr. ex Dahlgr.) Boatwr. and B-E.Van Wyk
 Wiborgiella mucronata (Benth.) Boatwr. and B-E.Van Wyk
 Wiborgiella sessilifolia (Eckl. and Zeyh.) Boatwr. and B-E.Van Wyk
 Wiborgiella vlokii

References

Crotalarieae
Fabaceae genera
Flora of the Cape Provinces
Flora of the Free State